Aviation in Alaska has a central importance In the vast, lightly populated state with severe weather issues. The short highway system  links a few major population centers; railroads are of even lesser importance. Ocean ports, islands and river towns are served by ocean-going vessels. Air service makes up the rest.  Air service by "bush pilots" to the Interior and western Alaska, as well as the Aleutian Islands, allowed for the influx of settlers, the year-round contact of villages with the state's larger cities and services, mail and supplies, and rapid transportation of people and goods throughout the state.

Commercial service

Commercial service in Alaska began with Wien Air Alaska in 1927. It expanded in the 1930s with Pacific Alaska Airways, Barnhill & McGee Airways, McGee Airways and Star Air Service, with the latter two eventually becoming the core of Alaska Airlines in 1944.   Federal subsidies enable Essential Air Services in Alaska to continue, provided by airlines such as PenAir, Warbelow's Air Ventures, Wings of Alaska, Taquan Air, and Servant Air.

Notable pilots
 Carl Ben Eielson (1897–1929)
 Linious McGee (1897–1968)
 Russel Hyde Merrill (1894–1929)
 Ingrid Pederson, first woman to fly a small airplane over the North Pole
 Noel Wien (1899–1977)
 Roy S Dickson (1901-1958)

See also
 History of Alaska, History of aviation
 Alaska World War II Army Airfields
 Northwest Staging Route
 List of airlines in Alaska
 List of airports in Alaska, Weeks Field

Notes

Further reading
 Liefer, Gregory. Broken Wings: Aviation Disasters in Alaska (Publication Consultants, 2014).
 Levi, Steve. Cowboys of the Sky: The Story of Alaska's Bush Pilots (Publication Consultants, 2008).
 Ringsmuth, Katherine Johnson. Alaska's Skyboys: Cowboy Pilots and the Myth of the Lost Frontier (University of Washington Press, 2015).
 Satterfield, Archie. The Alaska Airlines Story (Alaska Northwest Books, 1981).

External links
 Aviation for Alaska: Present and Proposed  Manuscript at Dartmouth College Library 

Alaska
Aviation in Alaska
History of Alaska